is a Japanese material-handling equipment company, founded in 1937, in Osaka.  it was the leading material handling system supplier in the world.

Name origin
It was founded as Sakaguchi Kikai Seisakusho Ltd., and renamed to Kanematsu Kiko in 1944 then Daifuku Machinery Works Co., Ltd. in 1947. Its modern name Daifuku Co., Ltd. has been used since 1984.

References

External links
 Official site 

Manufacturing companies based in Osaka
Companies listed on the Tokyo Stock Exchange
Manufacturing companies established in 1937
Japanese brands
Japanese companies established in 1937